Race Ethnicity and Education is a biannual peer-reviewed academic journal covering ethnic studies as it pertains to education. It was established in 1998 and is published by Routledge. It is supported by the American Educational Research Association's Critical Examination of Race, Ethnicity, Class and Gender in Education Special Interest Group, as well as by the British Educational Research Association's ’Race’ Ethnicity and Education Special Interest Group. The editor-in-chief is David Gillborn (UCL Institute of Education). According to the Journal Citation Reports, the journal has a 2016 impact factor of 1.257.

References

External links

Routledge academic journals
Biannual journals
Publications established in 1998
Academic journals associated with learned and professional societies of the United States
Academic journals associated with learned and professional societies of the United Kingdom
English-language journals
Ethnic studies journals
Education journals